The Arrabal of Saint Martin (Spanish: Arrabal de San Martín) was a medieval arrabal (neighborhood) that sat outside the Christian Walls of Madrid.

Background 

The founding of the arrabal, as a small pueblo, was prompted by the founding of the Benedictine , a Mozarabic priory subject to the Abbey of Santo Domingo de Silos and originally outside the town of Madrid and its authority. This is clear from the text of the "municipal charter" granted in 1126 by Alfonso VII of Castile to the prior of the vicus Sancti Martini similar to the privileges granted to the convents of Silos and Sahagún. The charter granted the prior civil, criminal and ecclesiastical jurisdiction, both within of the abbey as on the inhabitants of the arrabal.

In the middle of the 16th century, the aforementioned monastery of the Descalzas Reales, next to the Monastery of Saint Martin,  built in 1559 by the architect , on the site previously occupied by an old palace.

See also 

 Walls del Arrabal

Notes

References

Bibliography

External links 
 

Sol neighborhood, Madrid